Atid is a commune in Harghita County, Romania. It lies in the Székely Land, an ethno-cultural region in eastern Transylvania.

Component villages
The commune is composed of five villages:

History 
From ancient times the area was populated by Dacians. After the Roman conquest of Dacia, the Romans imposed their control in the area by constructing a fort known as Praetoria Augusta in Inlăceni village. The fort was discovered in 1858.

 The villages were historically part of the Székely Land region of Transylvania province. They belonged to Udvarhely district until the administrative reform of Transylvania in 1876, when they fell within Udvarhely County in the Kingdom of Hungary. After the Treaty of Trianon of 1920, they became part of Romania and fell within Odorhei County during the interwar period. In 1940, the second Vienna Award granted Northern Transylvania to Hungary, which held it until 1944. After Soviet occupation, the Romanian administration returned, and the commune became officially part of Romania in 1947. Between 1952 and 1960, the commune fell within the Magyar Autonomous Region, between 1960 and 1968 the Mureș-Magyar Autonomous Region. In 1968, the province was abolished, and since then, the commune has been part of Harghita County.

The Reformed church was built in 1802, on the site of a 17th-century church destroyed in the great fire of 8 September 1792. The Roman Catholic parish church was built in 1876 in honor of St. Michael.  Its tower was completed in 1889. The village used to be famous for its weekly fairs.

Demographics
The commune has an absolute Székely Hungarian majority. According to the 2002 census it has a population of 2,837 of which 98.37% or 2,791 are Hungarian.

Villages

Atid 
Atid ( had 1228 inhabitants at the 2011.

Inlăceni 
Inlăceni had 228 inhabitants in 1992, all of them Székely Hungarians. As in the village's vicinity, most inhabitants belong to the Unitarian Church of Transylvania.

References

Communes in Harghita County
Localities in Transylvania
Székely communities